David Wallace Wotherspoon (born 16 January 1990) is a professional soccer player who plays as a midfielder for Scottish Premiership club St Johnstone, and the Canada national team. Wotherspoon started his career with Hibernian. Born in Scotland, he represented his nation of birth at youth international levels, up to and including the under-21 level, before switching to Canada in 2018.

Club career

Early career
He played at the youth level with Abernethy Cubs, Bridge of Earn AFC, and the St Johnstone Academy.

Wotherspoon was part of Celtic's youth setup, but moved to Hibernian in the belief that he would have more opportunity to break into senior football.

Hibernian
He was part of the Hibernian youth side that won both the Scottish Youth Cup and the Scottish league in the 2008–09 season, with Wotherspoon contributing eight goals from midfield.

Wotherspoon made his senior debut in the 2–1 home win over St Mirren at the start of the 2009–10 season, scoring Hibs' first goal. After establishing himself in the Hibs first team as a right back, Wotherspoon signed a contract with Hibs until 2013.

During the 2010–11 season Wotherspoon was more often used as a right midfielder, and in early 2011 he scored two goals against St Mirren and St Johnstone to help his team go on a six-match unbeaten run. He had previously not scored in 63 matches and said that he wanted to start scoring more goals for Hibs.

Wotherspoon's form improved in the early part of the 2012–13 season. He scored a late winning goal in the Scottish Cup tie against holders and Edinburgh derby rivals Hearts. A decline in Hibs' fortunes during the season was mirrored by Wotherspoon personally, who lost his place in the side. He left Hibs at the end of his contract in the 2013 close season.

St Johnstone
Wotherspoon signed a two-year contract with his hometown club St Johnstone on 2 July 2013. On 10 July 2013, Wotherspoon scored a goal from a free-kick from 21 yards in a pre-season friendly against Cowdenbeath. This was his first appearance and his first goal for St Johnstone. He scored his first league goal for the club with a free kick in a 4–0 win against Ross County on 17 August, and had a penalty kick saved in the same game. Wotherspoon helped the club win the 2013–14 Scottish Cup. He signed a new two-year contract with St Johnstone in January 2015.

In February 2019, Wotherspoon extended his contract with St Johnstone for another two years. On 26 October 2019, he made his 250th appearance for the club, and marked the occasion by scoring twice as St Johnstone won 3–2 against Hamilton Academical. In 2021 Wotherspoon played a critical role in helping St Johnstone achieve the cup double, winning both the Scottish Cup and the Scottish League Cup. In the Scottish Cup Final, Wotherspoon had an assist on Shaun Rooney's goal and was named Man of the Match for his efforts.

In November 2021 Wotherspoon suffered an ACL injury during St. Johnstone's Scottish League Cup semi-final against Celtic, ruling him out for eight months. He returned to training in August 2022. Two months later Wotherspoon made his first appearance for St Johnstone since his injury on 15 October, subbing into their league match against Livingston which ended in a 1-0 defeat.

International career

Scotland
Wotherspoon represented Scotland at under-18 and under-19 levels before he made his first team debut for Hibs. He was called into the under-21 squad soon after he made his senior club debut, and he made his first appearance at that level in a 4–0 win against Azerbaijan in November 2009. He scored his first goal for the team, a late equaliser in a 1–1 draw against Sweden, in August 2010. His second goal was the match-winner in a 2–1 victory against the Netherlands in November 2011.

Canada
Wotherspoon was eligible to play for Canada as his mother was born there. He was selected for the Canada squad in March 2018 for a friendly against New Zealand without ever having been to Canada. He was again called up for a pair of CONCACAF Nations League A matches against Cuba in September 2019. In May 2019 Wotherspoon was named to the provisional squad for the 2019 CONCACAF Gold Cup, but was excluded from the final squad. Wotherspoon scored his first goal for Canada against the Cayman Islands in a 2022 FIFA World Cup qualifying match on 29 March 2021. On 18 June he was named to the 60-man provisional squad for the 2021 CONCACAF Gold Cup, but it was decided due to his heavy club schedule, he would not be a part of the final 23-man team.

In November 2022, Wotherspoon was named to Canada's squad for the 2022 FIFA World Cup.

Style of play
Although he started out as a right back for Hibs, Wotherspoon has also played as a right-sided or attacking midfielder. His primary position is as a central midfielder and at the start of the 2011–12 season he expressed his desire to play there more often. Although he also said that he was willing to play anywhere to be in the first team. Manager Pat Fenlon experimented with a 4–2–3–1 formation, using Wotherspoon as a central creative player, during the 2012–13 pre-season. These tactics were abandoned after a 3–0 defeat against Dundee United, with Wotherspoon then being used as a right midfielder in a more orthodox 4–4–2 shape.

In recent years, Wotherspoon has become known for his regular use of the "Spoony chop".

Personal life
Wotherspoon, who is from Bridge of Earn, was a St Johnstone supporter in his childhood. His mother was born in Canada.

Career statistics

Club

International

International goals

Scores and results list Canada's goal tally first, score column indicates score after each Wotherspoon goal.

Honours
St Johnstone
Scottish Cup: 2013–14, 2020–21
Scottish League Cup: 2020–21

See also
List of sportspeople who competed for more than one nation

References

External links
David Wotherspoon profile St Johnstone official website

1990 births
Living people
Footballers from Perth, Scotland
Scottish people of Canadian descent
Citizens of Canada through descent
Canada men's international soccer players
Canadian soccer players
Scottish footballers
Association football defenders
Association football midfielders
Scotland youth international footballers
Scotland under-21 international footballers
Hibernian F.C. players
St Johnstone F.C. players
Scottish Premier League players
Scottish Professional Football League players
People educated at Perth High School
2022 FIFA World Cup players